Javier Murguialday Chasco (born 4 February 1962) is a Spanish former professional road bicycle racer, who won one stage in the 1992 Tour de France.

Major results

1985
Memorial Valenciaga
1992
Vuelta a Mallorca
Tour de France:
Winner stage 2

External links 

Official Tour de France results for Javier Murguialday

Spanish male cyclists
1962 births
Living people
Spanish Tour de France stage winners
Sportspeople from Álava
Cyclists from the Basque Country (autonomous community)